Attila Árpád Szalai (born 20 January 1998) is a Hungarian professional footballer who plays as a centre-back for Süper Lig club Fenerbahçe and the Hungary national team.

Club career

Rapid Wien
Szalai made his debut in Austrian Bundesliga on 11 May 2016 against Altach.

Fenerbahçe
On 17 January 2021, Szalai signed a four-and-a-half-year contract with Fenerbahçe On 25 January 2021, he made his debut for Fenerbahçe in a Süper Lig game against Kayserispor at the Ülker Arena, which Fenerbahçe won 3–0.

On 8 March 2021, he scored his first goal in the Süper Lig against Konyaspor at the Konya Büyükşehir Stadium on the 29th matchday of the 2020–21 Süper Lig season. Fenerbahçe won 3–0.

On 28 February 2022, he scored his first and only goal in the 2021–22 Süper Lig season against Kasımpaşa S.K. at the Recep Tayyip Erdoğan Stadium, Istanbul. The match ended with a 2–1 victory for Fenerbahçe.

International career 

Szalai made his debut for Hungary national team on 15 November 2019 in a friendly against Uruguay. He was substituted for Botond Baráth in the 72nd minute.

On 1 June 2021, Szalai was included in the final 26-man squad to represent Hungary at the rescheduled UEFA Euro 2020 tournament.

He scored his first goal against Luxembourg in a friendly match at the Stade de Luxembourg in Gasperich, Luxembourg City, Luxembourg on 17 November 2022.

Career statistics

International
.

Scores and results list Hungary's goal tally first, score column indicates score after each Szalai goal.

References

External links

1998 births
Living people
Footballers from Budapest
Hungarian footballers
Hungary youth international footballers
Hungary under-21 international footballers
Hungary international footballers
Association football midfielders
SK Rapid Wien players
Mezőkövesdi SE footballers
Apollon Limassol FC players
Fenerbahçe S.K. footballers
Austrian Football Bundesliga players
Nemzeti Bajnokság I players
Cypriot First Division players
Süper Lig players
UEFA Euro 2020 players
Hungarian expatriate footballers
Expatriate footballers in Austria
Expatriate footballers in Cyprus
Expatriate footballers in Turkey
Hungarian expatriate sportspeople in Austria
Hungarian expatriate sportspeople in Cyprus
Hungarian expatriate sportspeople in Turkey